The Women's singles competition at the 2019 FIL World Luge Championships was held on 26 January 2019.

Results
The first run was held at 14:23 and the second run at 16:20.

References

Women's singles